The United States territory of Guam has no railways or freeways, nor does it have a merchant marine.  The largest port is Apra Harbor,  which serves almost all commercial traffic including cruise, cargo and fishing vessels. There are smaller harbors located on the island (most notably one in Hagatna and one in Agat) which serve recreational boaters.  Roads are primarily paved by a coral/oil mixture that, when it gets wet, tends to have oil float to the surface, making the roads dangerous. This is one of the reasons the speed limit on most of the island is 35 mph. But, during road repair or maintenance, a different mixture of asphalt that is not as slippery is used. Its main commercial airport is the Antonio B. Won Pat International Airport.

Highways:
 total: 885 km
 paved: 675 km
 unpaved: 210 km
 note: there is another 685 km of roads classified non-public, including roads located on federal government installations

Airports:
5 (1999 est.)

Airports - with paved runways:
 total: 4
 over 3,047 m: 2
 2,438 to 3,047 m: 1
 914 to 1,523 m: 1 (2007 est.)

Airports - with unpaved runways:
 total: 1
 under 914 m: 1 (2007 est.)

See also 
 Guam
 List of highways in Guam

References

 
Guam